Jordan Petroleum Refinery Company (Arabic: شركة مصفاة البترول الأردنية) runs the only oil refinery in Jordan. It was established in 1956, 
The idea of establishing Jordan Petroleum Refinery Company dates back to more than half a century when the idea was adopted by the then Ministry of National Economy, and there was a consensus on the importance of refining industry as a main source of energy for most of the economic activities and as a contributor to raising the Kingdom's revenues. Although it is the only Refinery in Jordan, it managed to supply the local market with all its needs of various petroleum products, and its establishment had led to complete dependence on the imported high-cost oil derivatives; this had saved the Jordanian economy significant amounts of foreign currency, made available thousands job opportunities to citizens, opened the door to other new industries, and contributed to supporting important economy sectors such as the sector of electricity, transportation, industry and constructions.

See also

List of companies of Jordan

External links
 Jordan Petroleum Refinery Company website

1956 establishments in Jordan
Oil and gas companies of Jordan
Zarqa